Julie Gavras is a French film director and screenwriter. She is known for her film Blame It on Fidel (2006).

Life and career
After graduate studies in literature and law, Julie Gavras turned to cinema. Gavras started as an assistant director in Italy and France on commercials, television movies and feature films. She worked with directors as diverse as Robert Enrico, Claire Devers, Jacques Nolot, Alexandre Jardin, Camille de Casabianca, Roberto Faenza and Michele Soavi. She also worked with her father on his 2002 World War II drama Amen., on which she served as an assistant director.

In 1998, she directed a short film called Oh les beaux dimanches! produced in Marseille by Comic Strip.  Two years later, she directed her first documentary, From Dawn to Night: Songs by Moroccan Women. It was based on a play by Alain Weber mounted at the Bouffes du Nord theater in Paris during the Festival d'Automne. It was broadcast on Arte. In 2002, her second documentary film was released theatrically in France: The Pirate, the Wizard, the Thief and the Children. The film looks at a class of nine-year-olds who make a film at school.

Her first fiction feature film, Blame It on Fidel, premiered at the Deauville American Film Festival in 2006. It was followed by Late Bloomers, a romantic comedy film starring Isabella Rossellini and William Hurt, which was screened at the 61st Berlin International Film Festival.

Filmography

References

External links

French film directors
Year of birth missing (living people)
Living people
French women film directors
French women screenwriters
French screenwriters
French music video directors
French people of Greek descent
Film people from Paris